The 26 June 2008 Karmah bombing was a suicide attack on a meeting of tribal sheiks in the town of Al-Karmah.  Three Marines from 2nd Battalion 3rd Marines (including the battalion's commanding officer), as well as twenty Iraqi sheiks and the mayor of Karmah, were killed when a suicide bomber dressed as an Iraqi Policeman detonated an explosive vest. Two interpreters were also killed in the blast.  The aftermath of the attack was captured on film by photojournalist Zoriah Miller.  The commanding officer of 2/3, LtCol Max Galeai and two other Marines (Captain Philip  J. Dykeman and Cpl. Marcus W. Preudhomme) from the battalion were killed. In June 2008, it was announced that Anbar would be the tenth province to transfer to Provincial Iraqi Control, the first Sunni Arab region to be handed back. This handover was delayed due to the attack. The handover did occur on September 1, 2008.  Two insurgents linked to the bombing were later caught in Tamariya.

References

2008 murders in Iraq
Mass murder in 2008
Terrorist incidents in Iraq in 2008
Iraqi insurgency (2003–2011)
Suicide bombings in Iraq
United States Marine Corps in the Iraq War
June 2008 events in Iraq